Jacques Aletti (born 18 March 1955) is a French athlete. He competed in the men's high jump at the 1976 Summer Olympics.

References

1955 births
Living people
Athletes (track and field) at the 1976 Summer Olympics
French male high jumpers
Olympic athletes of France
Pieds-Noirs
People from Tlemcen